Department of Elementary Education, Haryana (Hindi: प्राथमिक शिक्षा विभाग, हरियाणा) is a unit of the Government of Haryana  in India that looks after the school education in the state of Haryana.

History
In 1966, when Haryana state was carved out of Punjab there arose a need of separate department of Elementary Education. So, in 1966, a separate Department of Elementary Education was established for Haryana.

Description
The department is responsible for hiring and employing the Elementary school teachers for the Government Elementary schools of Government of Haryana. The department also runs the Haryana Board of School Education that conducts the school leaving examinations.

See also

 Director Secondary Education, Haryana
 Department of Higher Education, Haryana]
 Department of School Education, Haryana]

References

External links
HBSE Official Website
Department of Elementary Education, Haryana Official Website
Government of Haryana Official Website

Education in Haryana
Elementary Education
Haryana